In mathematics, density theorem may refer to
Density conjecture for Kleinian groups
Chebotarev's density theorem in algebraic number theory
Jacobson density theorem in algebra
Kaplansky density theorem in algebra
Lebesgue's density theorem in measure theory
Density theorem (category theory) in category theory